Thorogobius is a genus of gobies native to the eastern Atlantic Ocean and the Mediterranean Sea.

Species
There are currently six recognized species in this genus:
 Thorogobius alvheimi Sauberer, Iwamoto & Ahnelt, 2018 (Alvheim's goby)
 Thorogobius angolensis (Norman, 1935)
 Thorogobius ephippiatus (R. T. Lowe, 1839) (Leopard-spotted goby)
 Thorogobius laureatus Sauberer, Iwamoto & Ahnelt, 2018 (Laurelled goby)
 Thorogobius macrolepis (Kolombatović, 1891) (Large-scaled goby)
 Thorogobius rofeni P. J. Miller, 1988

References

Gobiidae